Halone ophiodes, the cryptic halone, is a moth of the subfamily Arctiinae. It was described by Edward Meyrick in 1886. It is found in Australia.

References

Lithosiini
Moths described in 1886